Vice Admiral Sir Neil Dudley Anderson,  (5 April 1927 – 5 June 2010) was a senior officer in the Royal New Zealand Navy (RNZN). He served as Chief of Naval Staff, the professional head of the RNZN, from 1978 to 1980 and as Chief of Defence Staff from 1980 to 1983. He married the author Barbara Anderson in 1951, and the couple had two children. He died on 5 June 2010 aged 83.

Anderson was appointed an Officer of the Order of the British Empire in the 1967 Queen's Birthday Honours, and advanced to Commander of the same order in the 1977 New Year Honours. Also in 1977, he was awarded the Queen Elizabeth II Silver Jubilee Medal. He was appointed a Companion of the Order of the Bath in the 1980 New Year Honours, and knighted as a Knight Commander of the Order of the British Empire in the 1982 Queen's Birthday Honours.

References

 

|-
 

1927 births
2010 deaths
New Zealand Companions of the Order of the Bath
New Zealand Knights Commander of the Order of the British Empire
Chiefs of Defence Force (New Zealand)
New Zealand military personnel of the Korean War
Royal New Zealand Navy personnel of World War II
Royal New Zealand Navy admirals